Angels of Love is the seventeenth studio album by Yngwie Malmsteen, released on March 10, 2009. The entirely instrumental album features nine all-new acoustic renditions of previously released material, as well as a previously unreleased track.

Malmsteen re-arranged all the compositions by himself and he is also the only performer on the album, playing acoustic, steel and classical guitars, keyboards, guitar synthesizer and cello, as well as few electric guitar fills.

The woman on the cover is Malmsteen's wife, April.

Track listing

Personnel 
 Yngwie Malmsteen – acoustic, electric, steel & classical guitars, cello, keyboards, guitar synthesizer
 Keith Rose – mixing
 Michael Troy Abdallah – additional keyboards

References 

2009 albums
Yngwie Malmsteen albums